John Sparks may refer to:
John Sparks (Nevada politician) (1843–1908), Governor of Nevada
John Sparks (Oklahoma politician), Oklahoma state senator and district representative
John Sparks (cricketer, born 1778) (1778–1854), English cricketer
John Sparks (cricketer, born 1873), English cricketer
John Sparks (footballer) (born 1957), Australian footballer for Melbourne
John E. Sparks (born 1953), Associate Judge of the United States Court of Appeals for the Armed Forces
John Sparks (rugby league), Australian rugby league player

See also
John Sparkes (born 1954), Welsh comedian
John Sparke (disambiguation)